Robin Hood: Mischief in Sherwood is a CG-animated series produced by Method Animation and DQ Entertainment (seasons 1–2), in co-production with Fabrique d'Images (season 1), ZDF, ZDF Enterprises, De Agostini Editore (season 1), and KidsMe S.r.l. (season 3), with the participation of TF1 (season 1) and The Walt Disney Company France, and in association with COFIMAGE 24. It is an animated adaptation of the Robin Hood story.
 
It has 52 episodes which are 15 minutes each. One distributor pairs them up, reducing the count to 26, then counts 13 of those as season 1, despite the series having aired continuously from June to July 2016.

Series overview

Characters
Robin Hood (voiced by Tom Wayland) is the teenage son of the Earl of Locksley.
Tuck (voiced by Eli James) is  based on Friar Tuck and a friend of Robin Hood who helps with Little John in stopping the plans of Prince John.
Little John (voiced by Jake Paque) is a friend of Robin Hood who helps with Tuck in stopping the plans of Prince John.
Prince John (voiced by David Nelson). 
Sheriff (voiced by David Wills) is based on the Sheriff of Nottingham. 
Rolf (voiced by Billy Bob Thompson) and Ralf (voiced by Marc Thompson) are the Sheriff's twin sons.
Marian (voiced by Sarah Natochenny) is based on Maid Marian and an apprentice magician who operates as a spy in Prince John's castle.
Derke is a dragon transformed into a hamster by Marian. 
Scarlett (voiced by Eileen Stevens) is based on Will Scarlet.
Flynn is a dog that helps The Sheriff hunt for Robin.
Matilda (voiced by Laurie Hymes) is Scarlett's mom and Robin Hood's aunt.
King Richard (voiced by HD Quinn) is based on King Richard.
Jack is the tall leader of the rouges.
Doug is the smallest of the rogues.
Fillcher is the heaviest of the rogues.

Episodes
Each season has 26 episodes with unique debut dates. Microsoft opts to pair 2 episodes as 1, renumbering 13 per season.

Season 1
The Conquest of Sherwood - 6 June 2016
Royal Lessons - 7 June 2016
The Hypnotizer - 8 June 2016
The Charlatan - 9 June 2016
The Other Robin 10 June 2016
The Treasure Chase - 11 June 2016
The Puppet Master - 12 June 2016
The Sword of Kings - 13 June 2016
Baby Hood - 14 June 2016
Lubin's Horse - 15 June 2016
Manhunt - 16 June 2016
Times Are A Changin' - 17 June 2016
The Magic Arrow - 18 June 2016
A Bottle Of Luck - 19 June 2016
Hail of Stones - 20 June 2016
The Statue Of The Prince - 21 June 2016
The Bitter Bit - 22 June 2016
The Invisible Gold - 23 June 2016
Princely Flight - 24 June 2016
One And Only Sheriff - 25 June 2016
The Pantry - 26 June 2016
The Ransom - 27 June 2016
Trapped In The Village - 28 June 2016
The Haunted Castle - 29 June 2016
Pigeon Post - 30 June 2016
Tuck Hood - 1 July 2016 
The Prince's Party - 2 July 2016
The Letter - 3 July 2016
The Five Puppets - 4 July 2016
Mirror Marian - 5 July 2016
The Sherewood Werewolf - 6 July 2016
The Prince's Windmill - 7 July 2016
The Prince's Water - 8 July 2016
In The Pursuit of Flynn - 9 July 2016
A Pretty Course - 10 July 2016
Team Work - 11 July 2016
Musical Mish-Mash - 12 July 2016
The Best of Enemies - 13 July 2016
The Apprentice Lawman - 14 July 2016
Betting the Blame - 15 July 2016
The Great Game - 16 July 2016
The Good, the Bad and the Ugly - 17 July 2016
The Ballaid of Robin Hood - 18 July 2016
John The Hero - 19 July 2016
Child's Play - 20 July 2016
The Alchemist - 21 July 2016
The Secret Garden - 22 July 2016
The Witch - 23 July 2016
A Joke Too Many - 24 July 2016
Damsel in Distress - 25 July 2016
Once Upon A Time In Sherwood - Part 1 – 26 July 2016
Once Upon A Time in Sherwood - Part 2 – 27 July 2016

Season 2
 Robin and the King - Part 1
 Robin and the King - Part 2
 Search for the Spell Book
 A New Recruit
 When Isabelle Interrupts
 A Most Surprising Birthday
 Sleeping Richard
 My Cuddly Dragon
 The Parrot of Contention
 The Man in the Clay Mask
 Robin's Bridge
 The Dragon's Egg
 Flute Fun
 A King too Many
 Tuck the Valiant
 The Ghost Coach
 That Thief, Robin!
 A Hero Named Little John
 The Smell of Disaster
 The Gold of the Beasts
 The Bewitched Cup
 Vanishing Marian
 Trapped in the Forest
 Sheriff Robin
 Sherwood on Fire
 Invisible Thieves
 The Knight with a Heart of Stone
 Robin the Gentleman
 A Royal Gift
 Faithful Flynn
 With Good Grace
 The Astrologer
 Rivals
 Scarlett and the Diamond
 Tumult at the Tumulus
 Marian Rules!
 A Dirty Trick
 Blaise the Brawn!
 What a Family!
 Endless Robin
 The Return of the Nightingale Diba
 Strange Damsels
 Uncharted Sherwood
 The Dragon Stone
 A Friendly Little Stroll
 Derke in a Box
 The King and the Hen
 The Invaders
 Burning with Enthusiasm
 The Steward
 Merlin's Book - Part 1
 Merlin's Book - Part 2

Season 3
The Threat - Part 1
The Threat - Part 2
Derke Under Control
The Wild Dragon
Princess in Danger
The Mentor
Robin's Arrows
Liv's Revenge
Surprise Bread
The Kidnapping
Without a Noise
He Who Knew Too Much
The Diabolical Trio
The Jewel of Peace
Unbearably Close Friends
The Royal Lottery
For a Fistful of Blueberries
The Remedy
The Visitor
The Ransom Runaway
A Question of Honor
What a Family!
King or Queen
All the Same
In Shock
Romance in Sherwood
Hide in a Bear Hide
The Mysterious Lamp
There's Always a Trick
A Nasty Temper
Sparks Will Fly
The New Chief
Eyes Closed
A Pet Dragon
Morgane
The New Kid
Samson Returns
The Fan
Beware of the Grumpy Dragon!
Sly as a Fox
The Squire with a Heart of Stone
The Parrot Pursuit
Like Father, Like Daughter
Derke's Nightmare
The Lord's Games
The Beast of Sherwood
Flynn's Exile
The Poisonous Melody
A Simple Servant
The Collection Chest
The Ultimate Evolution - Part 1
The Ultimate Evolution - Part 2

References

External links

2010s French animated television series
2010s German television series
2016 French television series debuts
2019 French television series endings
French children's animated fantasy television series
German children's animated fantasy television series
English-language television shows
Robin Hood television series
Teen animated television series
Television series by Method Animation